John Glover (1866 – 2 June 1947) was a New Zealand politician and trade unionist. He was an organiser and candidate for the United Labour, Social Democratic Party then the Labour Party serving time in local government.

Early life
Glover was born in 1866 in England. He spent his early years working as a miner before moving to New Zealand in 1899. Once in New Zealand he likewise worked as a miner and became involved in the local labour movement. From 1912 to 1913 he served as the secretary of the New Zealand Federation of Labour, known as the "Red Feds".

Political career
Glover joined the Social Democratic Party after the 1913 unity conference and was later elected the national secretary of the Social Democratic Party in 1916. He would later play a prominent role in the unity meetings in July 1916 that would merge the Social Democrats with the remnants of the United Labour Party which led to the foundation of the modern New Zealand Labour Party. Upon its creation he was elected as the Labour Party's inaugural secretary-treasurer, serving from 1916 to 1919.

In 1912, Glover had become the manager of the Maoriland Worker, New Zealand's leading labour journal of the time. In 1922 he was unsuccessfully prosecuted for blasphemous libel. To date, this is New Zealand's only trial for blasphemy ever held. Then Labour Party President Tom Paul later recalled of Glover: "...his service was as competent as it was unselfish. He just believed in the cause of Labour and worked hard in harmony with his faith. The movement has reason to thank the John Glovers of those early days".

Later, Glover would spend much time serving in local government. He served as a Wellington City Councillor twice in 1919–21 and 1926–27. Previously Glover had contested Wellington's mayoralty in 1914 for the Social Democratic Party, a more radical labour party than the existing United Labour Party who also stood a candidate resulting in a split vote on the left. Later he also served as the chairman of the Wellington Hospital Board.

Glover died on 2 June 1947.

Notes

References

1866 births
1947 deaths
New Zealand trade unionists
English emigrants to New Zealand
New Zealand Labour Party politicians
Social Democratic Party (New Zealand) politicians
United Labour Party (New Zealand) politicians
Wellington City Councillors
Wellington Hospital Board members